The Icelandic basketball league system, or Icelandic basketball league pyramid is a series of interconnected competitions for basketball clubs in Iceland. The system has a hierarchical format with a promotion and demotion system between competitions at different levels.

Men

There are currently four different competitions on the pyramid - the 1st tier Úrvalsdeild, the 2nd tier Division I, the 3rd tier Division II, and the 4th tier Division III.

The leagues are organized by the Icelandic Basketball Association.

The tier levels
For the 2020–21 season, the Icelandic basketball league system is as follows:

1The 1. deild karla has spot for 10 teams. The 10th placed team is relegated to 2. deild karla. If there are less than 10 teams, no team is relegated.

Other competitions
Icelandic Men's Basketball Cup
Icelandic Men's Basketball Supercup
Icelandic Men's Basketball League Cup

Women
There are currently three different competitions on the pyramid and they are all organized by the Icelandic Basketball Association.

{| class="wikitable" style="text-align: center;"
|-south
!colspan="1" width="4%" |Level
!colspan="10" width="96%" |League
|-
|colspan="1" width="4%" |1
|colspan="10" width="96%" |Úrvalsdeild kvenna8 teams↓ 1 relegation(previously 1. deild kvenna (1952–2005))
|-
|colspan="1" width="4%" |2
|colspan="10" width="96%" |1. deild kvenna12 teams1↑ 1 promotion(previously 2. deild kvenna (1984–2005))
|-
|colspan="1" width="4%" |2
|colspan="10" width="96%" |2. deild kvennaTBD
|-
|}

1Registered for the 2021-22 season. The amount of teams vary by seasons.''

Other competitions
Icelandic Women's Basketball Cup
Icelandic Women's Basketball Supercup
Icelandic Women's Basketball League Cup

See also
League system
European professional club basketball system
Polish basketball league system
Greek basketball league system
Italian basketball league system
French basketball league system
Russian basketball league system
Turkish basketball league system
German basketball league system
Hungarian basketball league system
South American professional club basketball system

References and notes

External links
Icelandic Basketball Association 

 
Basketball league systems